Griffin (Johnny Horton) is a fictional character appearing in American comic books published by Marvel Comics. He is the father of Yo-Yo Rodriguez.

Publication history

Griffin first appeared in Amazing Adventures #15 (Nov. 1972) and was created by Steve Englehart and Tom Sutton.

Fictional character biography
John "Johnny" Horton was born in Tacoma, Washington. He later became a punk in the New Orleans gangs trying to make a name for himself until a Chicago man used him for some local muscle. Impressing his employer, Horton wanted to be more than a cheap hood resulting in the Chicago man bringing him to the Secret Empire to be made into a supervillain. Horton did not know what the Secret Empire did. An unnamed scientist/surgeon that worked there followed the Empire's orders by surgically grafting a mane, large wings, lion-like paws, and a spiked prehensile tail to his body as well giving him an experimental mutagenic serum. The Empire's #1, #3, and #6 were present at this surgery. When Horton recovered, his face had become white and he was now a freak. Thus, he became the professional criminal known as the Griffin due to his resemblance to the mythological creature.

His first mission was to kill the Beast as part of the Secret Empire's campaign against the Brand Corporation. Griffin encountered Beast in his new furry mutation. During the struggle, Griffin was thrown off the building and Angel only to be attacked by Griffin and rescued by Beast. He later met with Linda Donaldson (Number Nine of Secret Empire) at her office in the Brand Corporation to discuss the case with Beast and his frustration of being turned into a monster.

His next mission was to kill Angel. In his battle with Angel, Beast wrapped his long arms around Griffin's wings causing them to crash into the ground. Griffin was taken away by the Brand Corporation guards (who are presumed to be working for Robert Baxter).

While in jail, he began to mutate with the serum used on him where his mind went first and ended up developing fanged teeth, a powerful tail, and superhuman strength. He faked being sick and escaped. When he located and confronted the unnamed scientist that changed him, the scientist was thrown to his death when he was unable to tell Griffin where the members of Secret Empire were. The scientist was saved by Spider-Man and Beast and told them Griffin's origin before dying. With his telepathic ability to control birds, Griffin revealed himself and attacked Spider-Man and Beast until he was defeated on the Brooklyn Bridge.

He later fought Ghost Rider, Angel, and the Champions alongside Darkstar, Rampage, Titanium Man, and the Crimson Dynamo in Los Angeles. They defeated the Champions and imprisoned them in a cell within the San Andreas Fault until Darkstar released them and Griffin was defeated again. To push his powers to their limits, he attacked Spider-Man with a flock of gulls and fled to attack Avengers Mansion only to find Wonder Man there. During the battle, Griffin later mutated with a leonine face and lost the power of speech. Griffin was presumed to have perished in the Astro-Fighter ship fire.

When he was residing in the Adirondack Mountains, he fell under the control of Headlok who used him to attack the West Coast Avengers. He was calmed by Tigra and defeated and sent to the Vault.

During Iron Man's "Armor Wars", Griffin escaped with Mister Hyde, Titania, Armadillo, and Vibro. He was defeated and was re-imprisoned by Falcon and Demolition-Man.

Griffin was seen in the Vault's Cell Block Five during the Acts of Vengeance storyline. He participated in a mass escape from the Vault.

Griffin joined Bullet and Orka in a breakout orchestrated by Mentallo and Venom. Griffin he was stunned by Captain America's shield throw and Hank Pym's force blaster, and was apprehended again.

Later, his mind was reduced to an instinctual animal level. He pursued and fought Namor the Sub-Mariner, but was defeated after Namor brought the battle underwater. Griffin ended up in Namor's custody as his steed. Namor used the Griffin to get to the Savage Land only to be ambushed by Super-Skrull disguised as Iron Fist. The Griffin helped Shanna free Namor and Namorita from Ward Meachum and the Super-Skrull.

Griffin is briefly seen in the 'Superhuman Rehabilitation Unit', a facility controlled by the Commission on Superhuman Activities. It is part of a deep 'hole' of cells. The front of each cell faces the others.

When Griffin was on Ryker's Island's prison, he was restored to a more humanoid state (presumably his intellect was restored). He was also among the inmates assembled by Electro during the impending breakout which is thwarted by the New Avengers.

Then, Griffin was hired by the Hood to take advantage of the split in the superhero community caused by the Superhuman Registration Act. He helped them fight the New Avengers but was taken down by Doctor Strange.

Griffin's daughter, Yo-Yo Rodriguez, is recruited by Nick Fury to join his anti-Skrull task force.

Griffin is seen as part of the anti-Skrull resistance force, as the Hood allies his group with the still-free heroes. As part of the Hood's group, he joins forces with various superheroes in battling Skrulls in Central Park.

He joins with the Hood's gang in an attack on the New Avengers, who were expecting the Dark Avengers instead. Hood's people had been brought in under Norman Osborn's control, who now was in charge of the Super-Human affairs for America. Osborn was using this position to gain revenge on his many enemies and Griffin was just a small part of it. Scorcher, Living Laser, Griffin, and Razor Fist are sent by the Hood to retrieve Tigra and Gauntlet after they flee from Norman Osborn. They attack the heroes, who are ultimately saved by Counter Force. He is seen to be among the new recruits for Camp H.A.M.M.E.R., Osborn's training facility. Later, he undergoes extensive Hammer training which does not bring him up to speed. He and his other recruits are considered failures.

Griffin assists Mandrill in attacking Spider-Man and Spider-Woman. Spider-Man knocks out the Griffin with one powerful uppercut. He was later seen during the Siege of Asgard as part of the Hood crime syndicate. However, his team lost and so the Hood was thrown in prison. Leaving the Griffin out of a job and back to a life of crime, he fought Spider-Man in the streets and was webbed up by him. The people yelled at Spider-Man for all the collateral damage that he caused during the fight. To make the situation worse for him, the Griffin told everyone at the scene that Spider-Man was his partner in crime, to make him look bad in front of the public.

Griffin fought Amadeus Cho, Hercules' close friend, who is now the new Prince of Power, after breaking out of prison. His powers were amplified due to the approach of the Chaos King.

During the "Fear Itself" storyline, Griffin is among the inmates to escape from the Raft after Juggernaut takes the form of Kuurth: Breaker of Stone and damages the facility heavily. Griffin assists Basilisk, Man-Bull, and another inmate in a bank robbery. When Hercules arrives to fight them, he recognizes the fourth person to be Hecate. During the fight between Hercules and the villains, Hecate looks into the Shield of Perseus and regains her memories. Hecate's magic turned Griffin into a more feline form. When Hercules fights a resurrected Kyknos, Basilisk and Man-Bull flee while Griffin stays behind and ends up becoming Hercules' steed. After Hercules recovers, Hercules and Griffin track down Basilisk and Man-Bull and convince them to help fight Kyknos and Hecate. After Kyknos was defeated and Hecate got away, Griffin, Man-Bull, and Basilisk returned to their normal forms.

Griffin is later recruited by Max Fury to join the Shadow Council's incarnation of the Masters of Evil.

Following the "Avengers vs. X-Men" storyline, Griffin was seen as an inmate at an unknown prison and was participating in a prison riot until he and the villains were defeated by Mimic and Rogue.

Powers and abilities
As a result of bionic surgery and injection of an experimental mutagenic serum, the Griffin has superhuman strength, speed, agility, and durability, with enhanced human reflexes/reactions. The Griffin has a chalk-white face resembling a lion's, hair resembling a lion's mane, pronounced canine teeth, sharp 1" claws on his fingers and toes, a scaled dinosaur-like hide, a 4' spiked prehensile tail, and wings with a wingspan of 18' from wingtip to wingtip. His wings enable him to fly at 150–160 mph. The weight he can carry in flight is uncertain, but the greater the weight, the slower the maximum speed he can reach. His claws and teeth can be used to rend flesh, wood, and possibly even soft metals. In his humanoid form, he has the telepathic ability to command birds.

At least in the past, the Griffin's physiology is such that he mutates into a more powerful form whenever his present abilities are pushed to the limit. Increases in power are typically accompanied by a more bestial form, with a corresponding decrease in intelligence. These changes tend to remain long-term. He has been seen in the form of a humanoid lion, as well as in a quadruped form closely resembling a winged lion. In both of these latter forms he had the intelligence of an animal, and was unable to access his telepathic powers, but was able to fight evenly with Wonder Man,  and the Sub-Mariner has stated him to likely be physically stronger.

His costume is composed of synthetic stretch fabric and leather.

In other media
 Griffin appears in The Avengers: Earth's Mightiest Heroes with his vocal effects provided by Fred Tatasciore. In the episode "The Breakout" Pt. 1, Griffin is incarcerated at the Big House until a technological fault leads to a mass breakout. In the episode "Who Do You Trust?", the Secret Warriors use Griffin to distract the Avengers while they bring Iron Man to Nick Fury. The fight culminates in Ms. Marvel fighting and eventually defeating him off-screen.

References

External links
 Griffin at Marvel Wiki
 Griffin at Comic Vine
 

Characters created by Steve Englehart
Comics characters introduced in 1972
Fictional characters from New Orleans
Fictional characters from Washington (state)
Marvel Comics characters who can move at superhuman speeds
Marvel Comics characters with superhuman strength
Marvel Comics male supervillains
Marvel Comics mutates
Marvel Comics supervillains
Marvel Comics telepaths